Papenteich is a Samtgemeinde in the district of Gifhorn in Lower Saxony, Germany, situated approximately 10 km south of Gifhorn, and 15 km north of Braunschweig. Papenteich was founded on October 2, 1970 and includes 6 local municipalities with 19 villages. At present its population is 23,458.

Geography

Structure
Papenteich was founded with eighteen member municipalities. With the reform of 1974, five municipalities with eighteen villages were constructed. The last reform was in 1981 with the integration of the village of Didderse as the sixth municipality. The administration of Papenteich is situated in the central village of Meine.

Neighbourhood

Structure of Papenteich

References

Samtgemeinden in Lower Saxony
Gifhorn (district)